Copelatus barbouri is a species of diving beetle. It is part of the genus Copelatus in the subfamily Copelatinae of the family Dytiscidae. It was described in Cuba by Young in 1942.

References

barbouri
Beetles described in 1942